Bruno Gabriel Soares (born 21 August 1988) is a Brazilian professional footballer who plays as a centre-back for German  club SV Meppen.

Career

Club
Soares was born in Belo Horizonte. He joined Duisburg in the summer of 2009, after he spent his youth and first years as a senior playing in Brazil.

In summer 2012, Soares joined newly promoted Fortuna Düsseldorf and signed a contract until 30 June 2015.

On 23 June 2015, Soares signed a three-year contract with Kazakhstan Premier League side FC Kairat. Despite being linked with a loan move to Ordabsay at the start of 2017, Soares left Kairat before the start of the 2017 season, becoming a free agent, eventually signing for Eliteserien side Haugesund. Soares left Haugesund by mutual consent on 3 July 2017, signing with Hapoel Tel Aviv shortly after.

On 24 December 2017, Soares was announced as a new signing for Malaysia Super League club Johor Darul Ta'zim. Initially brought in to played for senior team, but after poor performance during AFC Champions league play off against Muangthong he had been demoted to the JDTII.

On 7 July 2021, Soares joined 3. Liga side FC Saarbrücken on a one-year contract. However, his contract with FC Saarbrücken was terminated on 15 July due to residency issues.

On 31 January 2023, Soares returned to Germany and signed with SV Meppen in 3. Liga until the end of the season.

Career statistics

Club

References

External links

1988 births
Footballers from Belo Horizonte
Living people
Association football central defenders
Brazilian footballers
Coritiba Foot Ball Club players
Toledo Esporte Clube players
Nacional Atlético Clube Sociedade Civil players
Paraná Clube players
MSV Duisburg players
Fortuna Düsseldorf players
FC Kairat players
FK Haugesund players
Hapoel Tel Aviv F.C. players
Johor Darul Ta'zim II F.C. players
WSG Tirol players
Handknattleiksfélag Kópavogs players
SV Meppen players
2. Bundesliga players
Kazakhstan Premier League players
Eliteserien players
Liga Leumit players
Austrian Football Bundesliga players
1. deild karla players
Brazilian expatriate footballers
Brazilian expatriate sportspeople in Germany
Brazilian expatriate sportspeople in Kazakhstan
Brazilian expatriate sportspeople in Norway
Brazilian expatriate sportspeople in Israel
Brazilian expatriate sportspeople in Malaysia
Brazilian expatriate sportspeople in Austria
Expatriate footballers in Germany
Expatriate footballers in Kazakhstan
Expatriate footballers in Norway
Expatriate footballers in Israel
Expatriate footballers in Malaysia
Expatriate footballers in Austria